Little Wittenham SSSI is a  biological Site of Special Scientific Interest north-east of Didcot in Oxfordshire. It is also a Special Area of Conservation. 

This site, which is managed by the Earth Trust, consists of woods, grassland, scrub and ponds on the slope of a hill next to the River Thames. Flora include the nationally scarce greater dodder, and there is a rich assemblage of amphibians, including one of the largest populations in the country of the great crested newt, which is a priority species of the Biodiversity action plan.

References

 
Sites of Special Scientific Interest in Oxfordshire
Special Areas of Conservation in England